The 1896 Manitoba Hockey Association season was a series of five games contested by the senior ice hockey teams of Winnipeg Victorias and the Winnipeg Hockey Club. During the season, on February 14 the Victorias played a Stanley Cup challenge match in Montreal, defeating the Montreal Victorias. Winnipeg won 2–0 to win the Cup. This was the first time the Stanley Cup champion was from a league other than the Amateur Hockey Association of Canada. The Victorias won the season series to retain the Cup for the league.

Season

Final standing 

Source: Winnipeg Tribune, Zweig lists awarded game as tie.

Schedule 

‡ Game awarded to Winnipeg when Armytage refused to accept a penalty.† Exhibition

All games were played at the McIntyre Rink.

Source: Winnipeg Tribune

Exhibitions 
In January, the Winnipegs travelled to St. Paul, Minnesota, to play matches during the winter carnival. Winnipeg defeated St. Paul 18–2 and a Minneapolis ice polo team 7–2.

Playoffs 
There were no playoffs as the Victorias won first place exclusively.

Stanley Cup challenge

Victorias vs. Winnipeg at Montreal 

The first successful challenge to the Cup came in February 1896 by the Winnipeg Victorias, playing as the 1895 champions of the MHA. On February 14, Winnipeg beat the defending champion Montreal Victorias, 2–0, becoming the first team outside the Amateur Hockey Association of Canada (AHAC) to win the Cup. Winnipeg took a 2–0 lead on goals by Armytage and Campbell in the first half, then went on the defensive in the second half.

According to The Globe, in its report on the game:

"The westerners started in with a rush and scored the two games; one in ten minutes and one in nine minutes before the Vics seemed to waken up. For the rest of the first half, the honors were even. In the second half, the Winnipeggers were strictly on the defensive. Shot after shot was fired on their goal but the Vics could not score due to the superb work of Merritt, the visitor's goalkeeper. The match ended 2 to 0 in favour of the visitors. Both sides were dissatisfied with the work of Mr. Alexis Martin of Toronto as referee; claiming he was utterly ignorant of the rules, an opinion which seemed to be shared by the spectators."

Winnipeg at Montreal

Referee - A. F. Martin, Toronto

First goal 
Jack Armytage's biography at Manitoba Hockey Hall of Fame: "One of his greatest games was on February 14, 1896, in a sudden death game for the Stanley Cup when Jack Armytage scored the winning goal in 2-0 victory over Montreal; the first time the Cup came West."

The first goal of the game was scored by Jack Armytage, although Dan Bain's Hockey Hall of Fame biography lists Bain as the goal scorer. "On February 14, 1896, the team traveled east to try to strip the Montreal Victorias of their Stanley Cup. Bain scored the winning goal in the Westerners' 2-0 upset to claim the hallowed silverware." This is likely a misplaced reference to the 1901 challenge game for the Cup won 2–1 in which Bain scored both goals for Winnipeg, the second in overtime.

Newspaper accounts of the time list Armytage as the scorer, on a pass from Howard: According to the Winnipeg Tribune, in its report on the game: "It was rushed to the Montreal end where Howard lifted it from the corner to the front of the posts where Armytage was waiting and sent it through in 10 minutes." According to the Ottawa Journal, in its report on the game: "Armitage scored after 10 minutes of play on a pass from Howard."

Winnipeg Victorias 1896 Stanley Cup champions 

 -Note Winnipeg engraved 1895, because they defeated the 1895 champion before the 1896 hockey season was completed.

See also 
 1896 AHAC season
 List of Stanley Cup champions
 List of pre-NHL seasons

References 
 
 
Notes

MHA
Manitoba Hockey Association seasons